Gerhard Wohlgemuth (16 March 1920 in Frankfurt – 26 October 2001 in Halle (Saale)) was a German composer and literary editor. He wrote several film scores.

Film scores 
 Der kleine Kuno (1959)
 Doctor Ahrendt's Decision (1959)
 Mord an Rathenau (1961)
 The Adventures of Werner Holt (1964)
 Die Ohrfeige (1966/67)
 Rotkäppchen (1962)
 Rüpel (1963)
 Das Tal der sieben Monde (1967)
 Turlis Abenteuer (1967)
 Die Toten bleiben jung (1968)
  (1971/72)
 Mann gegen Mann (1976)

Further reading 
 Allihn, Ingeborg: Gerhard Wohlgemuth, in: Brennecke, Dietrich; Gerlach, Hannelore; Hansen, Matthias (editor): Musiker unserer Zeit, Leipzig 1979, p. 208ff.
 Wohlgemuth, Gerhard. In Wilfried W. Bruchhäuser: Komponisten der Gegenwart im Deutschen Komponisten-Interessenverband. Ein Handbuch. 4th edition, Deutscher Komponisten-Interessenverband, Berlin 1995, .
 Finscher, Ludwig: Die Musik in Geschichte und Gegenwart, 2nd edition, Kassel, Stuttgart 1994–2007
 Hollfelder, Peter: Die Klaviermusik, Hambourg 1999
 Laux, Karl (editor): Das Musikleben in der Deutschen Demokratischen Republik, Leipzig o.–J.
 Laux, Karl: Beiheft zur LP ETERNA 8 20 938 unsere neue musik 5: Gerhard Wohlgemuth: Konzert für Violine und Orchester (1963), Gerhard Rosenfeld: Konzert für Violine und Orchester (1963)

References

External links 
 
 
 Gerhard Wohlgemuth at LVDK Sachsen-Anhalt
Composer's page (German) at Edition Peters (publisher)

1920 births
2001 deaths
Film people from Frankfurt
20th-century German composers
German film score composers
Literary editors
Recipients of the Patriotic Order of Merit
Handel Prize winners